WFOS is a Variety formatted broadcast radio station licensed to Chesapeake, Virginia, serving the Southside of Hampton Roads. WFOS is owned by Hampton Roads Educational Telecommunications Association.

History
On May 2, 1955, WFOS signed on the air as a 10-watt operation at the old Oscar Smith High School in South Norfolk, Virginia. WFOS started with the help of the widow of the school's namesake, who made a donation to the school for an antenna bought from a station down in Florida and other equipment. They wanted the station's call-sign to be WOFS, for Oscar Frommel Smith, but those were taken. They settled for WFOS. The idea was that running the station would allow students to learn the ins and outs of broadcasting and see if they were interested in radio as a career. The city of South Norfolk merged with Norfolk County to form the city of Chesapeake in 1963, resulting in the present city of license; at the same time, Chesapeake Public Schools replaced the South Norfolk school board as the licensee.

Students of Chesapeake Public Schools were put on the air to run hour-long shows or reading news or sports. The station sent students to cover local elections, even sending a contingent up to Richmond to cover state elections.

In October 1990, WFOS moved from 90.3 MHz to 88.7 MHz to accommodate the relocation of WHRO-FM, though it had to provide some protection to 88.5 FM in Virginia Beach. This was one leg of a three-part frequency and license shuffle that took years to come to fruition, in which WHRO-FM moved to 90.3 on WFOS's old license; the prior WHRO-FM became WHRV; and WFOS moved to what had been the frequency of the dormant WNHS at I. C. Norcom High School in Portsmouth. WNHS had launched September 14, 1973, but it had "fizzled out" with low student interest a decade later. The shuffling was made because the 90.3 frequency could be used at higher power than 89.5 or 88.7. WHRO bought the transmitter WFOS used on 88.7.

In the late 1990s, WFOS would increase its power to 15,500 watts. Eight DJs were on rotation during the week, playing their own music throughout the day without advertisements.

Sale to HRETA
In 2015, Chesapeake Public Schools abruptly stopped offering a radio program to their students. Advancements in technology had made music more accessible to the public in other formats. Partly as a result, jobs in local radio had become scarce, making it less vital for Chesapeake Public Schools to train students in radio. At the time, students interested in communications or audio engineering could get credit and experience in radio production. 

In November 2020, WFOS attempted fundraising, posting on its Twitter account that it was aiming to become listener-funded. By fall, it had raised 15% of a $40,000 goal. The station had a lengthy list of needed repairs, totaling about $150,000 on top of the $200,000 a year it cost to run it.

On January 27, 2021, Chesapeake Public Schools and the Hampton Roads Educational Telecommunications Authority, parent of WHRO FM and WHRV FM, reached a programming and services agreement to allow for the operations of the station to continue; two months later, HRETA filed to buy WFOS outright.

Time Machine Radio Network
WHRO Public Media (HRETA) took over ownership of the station on May 1, 2021, but was required to wait on final FCC approvals to fully operate the station. FCC gave final approvals in June 2021. The station is now dubbed the Time Machine Radio Network, and its broadcast reach expanded to all of Norfolk, Virginia Beach and Chesapeake. WFOS can still be heard at its old frequency, 88.7 FM, as well as at a new one, 99.3 FM. Additionally, listeners can pick it up at 90.3-2 HD or stream it online at whro.org/timemachine.

WHRO announced that two popular WFOS personalities are returning to host their own shows. Larry Williams, known for Larry’s Doo Wop and Larry’s Beach Party, will play beach music, and Jerry Carter, known for his show Blues Traffic Jam, will play blues. WHRV host Paul Shugrue, known for his program Out of the Box will take on the role of music coordinator for the station.

Time Machine Radio Network seeks to transport listeners to their favorite moments in time through music. Listeners will find a mix of tunes from the 1920s through the ‘60s, including Doo Wap, Motown, Oldies, Blues, Beach Music and more— all without commercials.

Translator
In addition to the main station, WFOS is relayed by one FM translator to widen its broadcast area.

References

External links
 

1955 establishments in Virginia
Radio stations established in 1955
FOS